French Meadows Reservoir is a manmade lake  northeast of Foresthill, California, United States on the Middle Fork of the American River.

Tahoe National Forest manages the recreational facilities which include five campgrounds, two group campgrounds and two paved boat launch ramps. Activities at the lake include powerboating, kayaking, canoeing, fishing,  picnicking and hiking.  The reservoir is entirely within a state game refuge so no firearms, pellet guns or archery weapons are allowed.

The California Office of Environmental Health Hazard Assessment (OEHHA) has developed a safe eating advisory for French Meadows Reservoir based on levels of mercury found in fish caught here.

History 
The reservoir was built in December 1964 with the construction on the Middle Fork of the American River of the L.L. Anderson Dam. The dam is rock-fill with earth core. French Meadows Reservoir is part of the Middle Fork Project for hydroelectric power generation and most of its water is diverted to the French Meadows Powerhouse, located along the north shore of Hell Hole Reservoir, by a tunnel. Releases from French Meadows Reservoir to the powerhouse began one year later, December 13, 1965. A minimal "fish flow" is released into the natural waterway of the Middle Fork of the American River for fish and wildlife habitat considerations. The project is operated by the Placer County Water Agency.

In September 2022, the area surrounding the reservoir was closed by the forest service due to the Mosquito Fire.

See also
List of dams and reservoirs in California
List of lakes in California

Footnotes

Reservoirs in Placer County, California
Tahoe National Forest
Dams in California
United States local public utility dams
Reservoirs in Northern California
1964 establishments in California